Vault (popularly known as The Yellow Peril) is a public sculpture located in Melbourne, Australia.  The work of sculptor Ron Robertson-Swann, Vault  is an abstract, minimalist sculpture built of large thick flat polygonal sheets of prefabricated steel, assembled in a way that suggests dynamic movement.  It is painted yellow.

Presently located outside the Australian Centre for Contemporary Art, it is a key work in Melbourne's public art collection, and of considerable historical importance to the city.

Vault has weathered much controversy throughout its existence.  Commissioned by the Melbourne City Council after winning a competition in May 1978, for the newly built Melbourne City Square, the sculpture was not even built before it began to attract criticism from certain media and council factions, on the grounds that its modern form was felt to be unsympathetic to the location.  The cost of $70,000 was also felt to be excessive.

The sculpture had no official name for over two years, and acquired a number of nicknames during this time.  Robertson-Swann himself called it The Thing.  The steelworkers who constructed it called it Steelhenge.  Newspapers gave it the derogatory nickname The Yellow Peril, a name which has stuck.  Robertson-Swann eventually officially named the sculpture Vault in September 1980.

Installed in the City Square in May 1980, Vault  lasted until December of that year, when its dismantling coincided with the State Government's sacking of the City Council.  The Builders Labourers Federation consequently placed bans on further City Square work projects.

In 1981, the Vault was re-erected at Batman Park, a less prominent part of the city. It remained there until 2002 when it was moved to a position outside the Australian Centre for Contemporary Art in Southbank.

In 2017, the sculpture was recommended for heritage protection, through inclusion in the City of Melbourne Planning Scheme Heritage Overlay, following a heritage study of the Southbank Area.

Vault has been inspirational for some built and propositional architectural projects designed in Melbourne. Several of Denton Corker Marshall's works have "adopted peril's yellow almost as a point of pride and solidarity" while its form has been manipulated in some works by ARM Architecture (Ashton Raggatt McDougall).

References

Notes
 Wallis, Geoffrey J. Peril in the square.  Melbourne: Indra, 2004 - 2006
 Melbourne's mellow peril The Age, 3 October 2002
 Maquette for Vault

Tourist attractions in Melbourne
Culture of Melbourne
Outdoor sculptures in Australia
1980 sculptures
Steel sculptures in Australia
Buildings and structures in the City of Melbourne (LGA)
Southbank, Victoria
1980 establishments in Australia